High Rock Farm is a historic plantation house located in Rockingham County, North Carolina. It dates to the early-19th century, and is a two-story, central hall plan, Federal style brick dwelling with a rear ell.  It sits on a full basement and has a hipped roof.  The front facade features a pedimented portico supported by two stuccoed columns and with a gallery at the second level.

Nathaniel Scales, who had also owned Deep Springs Plantation and Mulberry Island Plantation, left High Rock to his daughter, Mary Scales McCain after his death in 1824. Mary Scales was married to the great-great-great grandfather of U.S. Senator John McCain.

It was listed on the National Register of Historic Places in 1974.

References

Houses on the National Register of Historic Places in North Carolina
Federal architecture in North Carolina
Houses in Rockingham County, North Carolina
National Register of Historic Places in Rockingham County, North Carolina
Plantation houses in North Carolina
Scales family residences